The Skye Treck Skyseeker is a Canadian ultralight aircraft that was designed and produced by Skye Treck of Manitoba. The aircraft was supplied as a kit for amateur construction.

Design and development
It features a cable-braced high-wing, a single-seat, open cockpit, conventional landing gear and a single engine in pusher configuration.

The aircraft is made from bolted-together aluminium tubing, with the flying surfaces covered in Dacron sailcloth. Its single-surface  span wing's cable bracing is supported by a single kingpost. The pilot is accommodated on an open seat, without a windshield. The landing gear features bungee suspension on all three wheels and the tail wheel is steerable. No brakes are fitted. The engine utilizes a 2:1 belt reduction drive with a centrifugal clutch to allow the propeller to stop when the engine is at idle.

The Skyseeker sold in very large numbers in the 1980s in Canada.

Variants
Skyseeker Mk I
Initial single seat version with hybrid weight-shift and aerodynamic controls.
Skyseeker Mk II
Two seat version.
Skyseeker Mk III
Improved single seat version with three-axis aerodynamic controls, with spoilers for roll control.

Aircraft on display
British Columbia Aviation Museum

Specifications (Skyseeker Mk III)

References

External links
Photo of Skyseeker Mk III

1980s Canadian ultralight aircraft
Homebuilt aircraft
Single-engined pusher aircraft